The Buchan School is an independent primary school in the south of the Isle of Man, catering for children aged 3–11.  It is the junior school of King William's College.

History
The Buchan School was established by Lady Laura Buchan in the 1875 as a "school for females" and was originally known as The High School for Girls.  The original campus was located on Douglas Road, on the promenade in Castletown, however the school soon out-grew its original site and moved to a new site named "Westhill" about a mile away.  In 1991 The Buchan amalgamated with King William's College and changed to a co-educational prep school for King William's College.   the school had approximately 250 pupils.  The Buchan is the only independent primary school on the Isle of Man.

Houses
The Buchan comprises four houses.  Every pupil in the school is a member of one of the houses and represents them in awards and sporting events.  The school used to have a boarding house however this closed in 1999. The houses are named after famous Norse rulers of the Isle of Man.

 Magnus - Represented by the colour green
 Olaf - represented by the colour red
 Lagman - represented by the colour blue
 Godred - represented by the colour yellow

The Buchan Badge
The School has its own award system - the Buchan Badge.  This is awarded to pupils in Prep. (years 3-6) The award is based on the Duke of Edinburgh Award Scheme. Each pupil must take part in, and complete each of the sections of the award; Physical Activity, Country Craft or Field Craft and a Service.

Motto
The motto of The Buchan is Fortior Qui Melior, which means "The Braver The Better".

References

External links
The Buchan School

Schools in the Isle of Man
Educational institutions established in 1878
1878 establishments in the British Empire